Diamond Cement Ghana Limited is an Indian-owned Portland cement producing company located at Aflao in the Volta Region of Ghana near the border with Togo. The plant complements the Government Industrialization Program and economic up-lift. The company is using the latest technology of Programmable Logic Control (PLC) system in the cement production process to maintain consistency in the quality.

History 
It started production in 2002 with annual production of 700,000 tonnes of cement and was inaugurated by former President John Kufuor of Ghana in 2004.

The company in February 2014, completed a 2.5 km rail siding connecting it to the Togo Railway network, giving access to the port of Lomé, Togo, for easy delivering of clinker for cement production.

See also 

 Ghana Cement
 Cement in Africa
 Railway stations in Ghana
 Railway stations in Togo

References 

 

Cement companies of Ghana
Volta Region